Alan Jackson is an American country music singer and songwriter.

Alan Jackson may also refer to:
Alan Jackson (EastEnders), character in EastEnders
Alan Jackson (The Sarah Jane Adventures), character in The Sarah Jane Adventures
Alan Jackson (footballer) (born 1938), English professional footballer
Alan Jackson (poet) (born 1938), Scottish poet
Alan Jackson (cyclist) (1933–1974), British Olympic cyclist
Alan Robert Jackson (1936–2018), Australian businessman

See also
Allan Jackson (1915–1976), American radio broadcaster
Al Jackson (disambiguation)